Andy Yang may refer to:
Andrew Yang (born 1975), American businessman, politician, and author
Yang Zi (actress) (born 1992), Chinese actress, singer and model